Zurich Muller (born 1 May 1972) is a South African cricketer. He played in one List A match for Boland in 1995/96.

See also
 List of Boland representative cricketers

References

External links
 

1972 births
Living people
South African cricketers
Boland cricketers
Cricketers from Paarl